National Route 317 is a national highway of Japan connecting Matsuyama, Ehime and Onomichi, Hiroshima in Japan, with a total length of 99.2 km (61.64 mi).

References

317
Roads in Ehime Prefecture
Roads in Hiroshima Prefecture